The 1941 Lehigh Engineers football team was an American football team that represented Lehigh University during the 1941 college football season. In its eighth and final season under head coach Glen Harmeson, the team compiled a 0–6–3 record, and lost both games against its Middle Three Conference rivals. This was Lehigh's first winless campaign since its four-game, four-loss inaugural season in 1884.

The team played its home games at Taylor Stadium in Bethlehem, Pennsylvania.

Schedule

References

Lehigh
Lehigh Mountain Hawks football seasons
College football winless seasons
Lehigh Engineers football